The Energy Retail Association (ERA) was a trade association which promoted the interests of electricity and gas retailers in the domestic market in Great Britain, formed in 2003. In April 2012 it merged with the Association of Electricity Producers and the UK Business Council for Sustainable Energy to become Energy UK.

References

External links
 Energy UK

Business organisations based in the United Kingdom
Energy in the United Kingdom
Energy business associations
Retailing organizations
Service retailing